The Ministry of Transportation (MTO) is the provincial ministry of the Government of Ontario that is responsible for transport infrastructure and related law in Ontario. The ministry traces its roots back over a century to the 1890s, when the province began training Provincial Road Building Instructors. In 1916, the Department of Public Highways of Ontario (DPHO) was formed and tasked with establishing a network of provincial highways. The first was designated in 1918, and by the summer of 1925, sixteen highways were numbered. In the mid-1920s, a new Department of Northern Development (DND) was created to manage infrastructure improvements in northern Ontario; it merged with the Department of Highways of Ontario (DHO) on April 1, 1937. In 1971, the Department of Highways took on responsibility for Communications and in 1972 was reorganized as the Ministry of Transportation and Communications (MTC), which then became the Ministry of Transportation in 1987.

Overview
The MTO is in charge of various aspects of transportation in Ontario, including the establishment and maintenance of the provincial highway system, the registration of vehicles and licensing of drivers, and the policing of provincial roads, enforced by the Ontario Provincial Police and the ministry's in-house enforcement program (Commercial vehicle enforcement).

The MTO is responsible for:
10.4 million vehicle registrations
8.5 million driving licences
55 driver examination centres and 37 travel points (both operated by Plenary Serco (PS) DES, as DriveTest Centres)
281 privately owned Driver and Vehicle Licence Issuing Offices across the province
Metrolinx (responsible for GO Transit, Union Pearson Express, and Presto card)
 kilometres of provincial highways
ServiceOntario kiosks
Commercial vehicle enforcement program vehicles and infrastructure (varies annually).

History 

Early roads in Ontario were cleared when needed for local use and connections two other settlements. Key roads such as Yonge Street and Kingston Road were cleared by order from officials by various parties such as settlers, British Army units (portion of Yonge c. 1795 Queen's Rangers) or private contractors 
(Toronto to Trent section of Kingston Road c. 1799-1800 by Asa Danforth). Road standards varied (poor in winter or after rainfall) and used by horses or horse drawn stagecoaches.

With the arrival of motor vehicles proper road development an maintenance was needed. The earliest Ontario government office responsible for roads and transportation was the position of the Provincial Instructor in Road-Making, first appointed in 1896 and attached to the Ontario Department of Agriculture. A.W. Campbell held the position of Provincial Instructor in Road-Making from 1896 to 1900 and Director of the Office of the Commissioner of Highways from 1900 until 1910. He was tasked with training Provincial Road Building Instructors. These instructors worked to establish specifications for the almost  of county- and township- maintained roads.

The name of the office was changed to the Commissioner of Highways and transferred to the Department of Public Works in 1900. By 1910, the office was generally referred to as the Highways Branch. In 1910, W.A. McLean, Provincial Engineer of Highways, succeeded A.W. Campbell as the director of the Highways Branch.

Under considerable pressure from the Ontario Good Roads Association and the ever-increasing number of drivers, which the province itself licensed at that time, the Department of Public Highways was formed in 1916 with the goal of creating a provincial highway network. The department assumed all the functions of the Highways Branch. The department assumed its first highway, the Provincial Highway, on August 21, 1917. On February 20, 1920, the department assumed several hundred kilometres of new highways, formally establishing the provincial highway system. Although established as a separate department, the Department of Public Highways shared ministers with the Department of Public Works prior to 1931 and seems to have been in a quasi-subordinate relationship with this department.

In 1916, the Motor Vehicles Branch was established within the Ontario Department of Public Highways. Prior to this, responsibility for the registering and licensing of motor vehicles rested with the Provincial Secretary (a responsibility it held since 1903). Although there are references to motor vehicle licensing and registration between 1916 and 1918, there is no mention in the Annual Reports of what agency actually performed this function; it is, however, likely that it was a form of, or precursor to, the Motor Vehicles Branch. In 1919, a Registrar of Motor Vehicles, as head of the Motor Vehicles Branch, is clearly identified.

In 1917, the Provincial Highway Act was passed, giving the department authority to maintain and construct leading roads throughout the province as provincial highways (designated King's highways in 1930). The Department of Public Highways was renamed the Department of Highways in 1931 and was assigned its own minister, Leopold Macaulay, though Macaulay later held both portfolios in 1934.

In 1937, the Department of Northern Development, previously responsible for highways in the northern parts of the province, was merged into the Department of Highways, thus bringing all highway work in the province under one administration.

On July 1, 1957, legislation was passed which established a separate Department of Transport, and the Motor Vehicles Branch was transferred to this new department. The new department assumed responsibilities for vehicle licensing, vehicle inspection, driver examination, driver licensing and improvement, traffic engineering, accident claims, and highway safety. In addition, it was responsible for the Ontario Highway Transport Board.

In May 1971, the Department of Transport and the Department of Highways were amalgamated to form the Department of Transportation and Communications. The new department was presided over by the Charles MacNaughton, who had been both the Minister of Highways and the Minister of Transport prior to the amalgamation. The department was renamed the Ministry of Transportation and Communications in 1972 as part of a government wide reorganization.

In September 1987, the responsibilities for communications were transferred to the Ministry of Culture and Communications, and the ministry was renamed the Ministry of Transportation.

List of Ministers

Road maintenance

Maintenance work is performed in two different ways:
In Maintenance Outsource areas, where MTO staff monitor the road conditions and hire contractors on an as-need basis.
In Area Maintenance Contract areas, where one contractor is awarded a contract area and performs all maintenance work except for rehabilitation and new construction.

A list of Area Maintenance contractors currently under contract with the MTO includes:
Emcon Services Inc.
Ferrovial Services
Fowler Construction Company Ltd.
IMOS (Maintenance performed by Miller Maintenance)
C-Highway Maintenance Contracting Inc.
The 407 ETR Concession Company operates and maintains the stretch of Highway 407 from Burlington to Brougham under a lease from the Government of Ontario until the year 2098
The 407 East Development Group (407 EDG) maintains stretch of Highway 407 from 407 ETR to Harmony Road and Highway 412
Blackbird Infrastructure Group maintains stretch of Highway 407 from Harmony Road to Highway 115 and Highway 418
The Windsor Essex Mobility Group (WEMG) maintains the Herb Gray Parkway, the stretch of Highway 401 connecting to the future Gordie Howe International Bridge through Windsor, Ontario

Area term contracts (ATCs) are the latest maintenance and construction alternative being reviewed by the MTO. ATCs, if they are approved for tender, will cover all maintenance operations now performed by AMC contractors, but will also include annual pavement maintenance and replacement work, bridge rehabilitation, minor capital construction programs and corridor management.

Highway Carrier Safety and Enforcement
While policing on most MTO-managed roads is provided by the Ontario Provincial Police, certain law enforcement functions are provided by MTO Transportation Enforcement Officers and Ministry of Environment Emissions Enforcement Officers.

Ministry of Transportation Enforcement Officers (TEOs) enforce a variety of provincial highway safety legislation specific to operators of commercial vehicles. Driver hours of service, cargo securement, dangerous goods transportation, weights and dimensions, and vehicle maintenance and roadworthiness are the predominant focus of TEO inspection activities. Ontario's Highway Traffic Act, its regulations, the Compulsory Automobile Insurance Act, and the Dangerous Goods Transportation Act are core pieces of legislation from which TEOs derive their enforcement authorities. TEOs conduct commercial vehicle inspections using a standardized procedure established by the Commercial Vehicle Safety Alliance (CVSA).

Transportation Enforcement Officers inspect commercial vehicles, their loads, and driver's qualifications and documentation. They collect evidence, issue provincial offence notices or summons to court for violations, and testify in court.

Transportation Enforcement Officer deployment ranges from highway patrol and Truck Inspection Station (TIS) duties, audits of commercial vehicle operators, inspection and monitoring of bus and motor-coach operators, and the licensing and monitoring of Motor Vehicle Inspection Stations. Blitz-style joint force operations are periodically conducted in concert with provincial and municipal police.

Although many Transportation Enforcement Officers are licensed vehicle mechanics, most are not. TEOs hail from various backgrounds including driver licensing examination, automobile repair, commercial truck driving and other law enforcement agencies.

Offices

MTO's headquarters are located on three campuses:

Garden City Tower, St. Catharines, Ontario - 301 St. Paul Street
Downsview Complex, Toronto, Ontario - 87, 125, 145, and 159 Sir William Hearst Avenue
Ferguson Block, Toronto, Ontario - 77 Wellesley Street West

There are five regional offices:
Eastern - Kingston, Ontario
Central (Downsview) - Toronto, Ontario
Northwestern - Thunder Bay, Ontario
Southwestern - London, Ontario
Northeastern - North Bay, Ontario

Area offices are located in:

Bancroft, Ontario
North Bay, Ontario
Chatham, Ontario
Ottawa, Ontario
Owen Sound, Ontario
Cochrane, Ontario
Port Hope, Ontario
Huntsville, Ontario
Kenora, Ontario
Sault Ste. Marie, Ontario
Kingston, Ontario
London, Ontario
Sudbury, Ontario
Thunder Bay, Ontario
New Liskeard, Ontario

See also
Connecting Link
Vehicle registration plates of Ontario
Ontario's Drive Clean
Driving licence in Canada#Ontario
Partial cloverleaf interchange
Ontario tall-wall

References

Bibliography

External links

DriveTest website
Commercial Vehicle Safety Alliance website
MTO Locations in Greater Toronto Area

Transportation
Transport in Ontario
Ontario
Law enforcement agencies of Ontario
Motor vehicle registration agencies
1916 establishments in Ontario
Ministries established in 1916
Transport organizations based in Canada